Mirza Muhammad Murad Bakhsh, 
(9 October 1624 – 14 December 1661) was a Mughal prince and the youngest surviving son of Mughal Emperor Shah Jahan and Empress Mumtaz Mahal. He was the Subahdar of Balkh, till he was replaced by his elder brother Aurangzeb in the year 1647.

Family
Muhammad Murad Bakhsh was born on 9 October 1624, at the Rohtasgarh Fort in Bihar, as the sixth and youngest surviving son of Emperor Shah Jahan and his wife, Mumtaz Mahal. Murad's siblings included his two politically powerful sisters, the princesses Jahanara Begum and Roshanara Begum, as well as the heir-apparent to his father, his eldest brother, Crown Prince Dara Shikoh and the future Mughal Emperor Aurangzeb.

Personal life
In 1638, Murad Bakhsh, at the age of fourteen years, married the Safavid princess, Sakina Banu Begum, daughter of Shah Nawaz Khan Safavi. She was the younger sister of his elder sister-in-law, Dilras Banu Begum, who was Aurangzeb's wife.

Governorship

He was appointed as the Subadar of Multan (1642), of Balkh (16 February 1646 to 9 August 1646), of Kashmir (20 August 1647 to July 1648), of Deccan (25 July 1648 to 14 September 1649), and Kabul (23 January 1650 to 1654), of Gujarat (March 1654), and Malwa.

Courtiers

 Raja Aman Khan Bahadur – Died in 1661, Mewat
 Darar Khan – Died 1673, Mewat
 Muhammad Rustam Shaikh – Died 1648, Deccan.
 Muhammad Allahauddin Shaikh – Died 1655. He was brother of Rustam Shaikh.
 Miah Khan – Died 1653, Deccan. 
 Rajkumar Hariram Singh – 1622–1678(56), The Deputy of Murad Baksh from 1646-1651. He was second son of Raja Gaj Singh of Nagpur and the brother of Raja Amar Singh of Nagpur 
 Rajkumar Veer Singh – 1636–1680(44), Eldest son of Amar Singh of Nagpur.

War of succession

On 30 November 1657, he proclaimed himself emperor at Ahmedabad, after reports that his father was ill. During the same year, he received the Ottoman ambassador Manzada Husain Agha, who arrived in the port of Surat and was on his way to meet Shah Jahan in Agra. Manzada Husain Agha mentions his disappointment regarding the wars between Shah Jahan's sons.

Murad Bakhsh joined hands with Aurangzeb to defeat Dara Shikhoh, the eldest son of Shah Jahan. In fact, it was the ferocious charge led by Murad Bakhsh and his Sowars that eventually turned the outcome of the battle in favor of Aurangzeb during the Battle of Samugarh.  

On 7 July 1658, while he was in a tent with his brother Aurangzeb, he was intoxicated, secretly sent to the prison and transferred to Gwalior Fort from January 1659.

He faced a trial that sentenced him to death for having murdered former Diwan clerk named Ali Naqi, in 1661. Aurangzeb then replaced Murad Bakhsh as the Subedar of Gujarat, and placed Inayat Khan as the new Mughal commander of Surat.

Death
On 14 December 1661, after spending three years in prison, he was executed at Gwalior Fort. With the last of his brothers now dead, Aurangzeb was the undisputed emperor of the Mughal Empire.

Ancestry

See also
 Moradabad
 Shah Jahan
 Mughal–Safavid War (1649–1653)

References

1624 births
1661 deaths
Mughal princes
Timurid dynasty
Indian Muslims
People from Bihar
Subahdars of Gujarat
Indian people of Iranian descent